Scopula argentidisca is a moth of the family Geometridae. It was described by Warren in 1902. It is found in Kenya, Tanzania and Zambia.

References

Moths described in 1902
argentidisca
Moths of Africa
Taxa named by William Warren (entomologist)